Sablé is a French round shortbread cookie that originates in Sablé-sur-Sarthe in Sarthe.

History
According to the letters of the Marquise de Sévigné, the cookie was created for the first time in Sablé-sur-Sarthe in 1670.

The French word sablé means "sandy", which is the French term that takes the place of the English "breadcrumbs". Generally, the baker begins the process by rubbing cold butter into flour and sugar to form particles of dough until the texture resembles that of breadcrumbs or sand.

Recipe
Among the most well-known sablé recipes are those of La Mère Poulard, and the cookies of Saint-Michel and Pont-Aven.

Sablés can be flavoured with almonds, lemon or orange zest.

See also
 List of shortbread biscuits and cookies
 Sandies

References

External links
 

Cookies
French cuisine
Shortbread